Kiara is a suburb of Perth, Western Australia, situated approximately  northeast of Perth's central business district and  from Midland, and located within the City of Swan local government area.

Schools in Kiara are Kiara College and Good Shepherd Catholic School.

References

Suburbs of Perth, Western Australia
Suburbs and localities in the City of Swan